The 1905–06 team finished with a record 4–4. It was the third year for head coach Wilbur P. Bowen. The team captain was Roy S. Sprague.

Roster

Schedule

|-
!colspan=9 style="background:#006633; color:#FFFFFF;"| Non-conference regular season

1. Media guide list opponent as Detroit Athletic Club but yearbook list CMU.

References

Eastern Michigan Eagles men's basketball seasons
Michigan State Normal